The Madre de aguas (Mother of water), also known as Magüi, this is a mythical creature in the folklore of Cuba.

The legends say that the Madre de aguas is a giant boa snake very large and wide with the thickness of a palm tree, has two extrusions similar to horns in the frontal region of his head, and is covered in scales thick and distributed inversely as present in other boa snakes, which is impenetrable to bullets.

It is said that it inhabits rivers and lakes, which never dry out while it lives there. Madre de aguas never dies, and anyone who tries to kill or capture it dies. It also is said to be a fearsome animal that when hungry could completely engulf a calf.

References
 Dr. Jesús Guanche Pérez. Etnicidad cubana y seres míticos populares. Portal de la cultura de América Latina y el Caribe. (in Spanish)

Caribbean legendary creatures
Legendary serpents
Cuban culture